Uzhanskyi National Nature Park is a protected area in Ukraine. It is located in Velykyi Bereznyi Raion of Zakarpattia Oblast, at the border with Poland and Slovakia. Since 2007, it is part of the World Heritage site Primeval Beech Forests of the Carpathians and Other Regions of Europe. It is also part of the East Carpathian Biosphere Reserve. The park was created to protect pristine beech forest of the Carpathians.

History
In 1908, when the Transcarpathia still belonged to the Austro-Hungarian Empire, a nature reserve in the upper valley of the Stuzhychanka River to protect the beech forest landscape. Between 1919 and 1938, the Transcarpathia belonged to Czechoslovakia, and both reserves were considerably expanded in area. Another reserve was created on the Yavirnyk Mountain. After World War II, the area was completely neglected, and mass timber production started. In 1974, during the Soviet period, Stuzhytsia Forest Landscape Reserve was established. In 1995, the reserve was upgraded to a regional landscape park, and in 1999 to a national nature park.

Geography
The park is located in the valleys of the Uzh River and its tributaries in the western slopes of the Carpathian Mountains. The highest point of the park is Kinchyk Bukovskyi Mountain. Uzhanskyi National Nature Park contains four altitude zones, including beech forest, alder forest, and, above , alpine meadows. Climate is temperate, with the annual rainfall being around (and temperatures in winter below zero, so that the mountains are covered by snow.

Ecosystem
There are over 1500 species of plants in the park; about 22 of vascular plant species are endemic, and 52 species, including 23 species of orchids, are protected at the national level.

Big mammals include red deer, roe deer, wild boar, red fox, and badger. There are 114 bird species.

Tourism and infrastructure
The area is populated by Lemkos and has a strong influence of their culture. In particular, six wooden churches built in 17th-18th centuries survived inside the park.

17 trails are signposted within the park.

References

Protected areas of Zakarpattia Oblast
National parks of Ukraine
Protected areas established in 1999
Primeval Beech Forests in Europe